Betula albosinensis, the Chinese red birch, syn. B. bhojpattra var. sinensis, B. utilis var. sinensis, is a species of birch in the family Betulaceae, native to Western China. A particular feature is the peeling brown bark (cream when newly exposed). In fact the Latin specific name albosinensis means "white, from China". Brown catkins are produced in Spring.

Betula albosinensis is grown as an ornamental tree for parks and large gardens, and numerous cultivars have been produced. The cultivars 'China Rose', 'Fascination' and 'Red Panda' have gained the Royal Horticultural Society's Award of Garden Merit.

Gallery

References

albosinensis
Trees of China
Endemic flora of China